There have been several military units called 141st Regiment:
 141st Infantry Regiment (United States)
 141st Pennsylvania Infantry
 141st Regiment, Royal Armoured Corps, formerly 7th Battalion, "The Buffs"
 141st Training Aviation Regiment, unit of the Yugoslav Air Force